The St. Bonaventure Bonnies baseball team (formerly the St. Bonaventure Brown Indians) is a varsity intercollegiate athletic team of St. Bonaventure University in St. Bonaventure, New York, United States. The team is a member of the Atlantic 10 Conference, which is part of the National Collegiate Athletic Association's Division I. The team plays its home games at Fred Handler Park in St. Bonaventure, New York. The Bonnies are coached by Jason Rathbun.

Year-by-year results
Below is an incomplete table of St. Bonaventure's yearly records. It contains information dating only to 1984, when the program began competing in the Atlantic 10 Conference.

Major League Baseball
St. Bonaventure has had 17 Major League Baseball Draft selections since the draft began in 1965.

See also
List of NCAA Division I baseball programs

References

External links